The Life and Opinions of the Tomcat Murr together with a fragmentary Biography of Kapellmeister Johannes Kreisler on Random Sheets of Waste Paper is a complex satirical novel by Prussian Romantic-era author E. T. A. Hoffmann. It was first published in 1819–1821 as Lebens-Ansichten des Katers Murr nebst fragmentarischer Biographie des Kapellmeisters Johannes Kreisler in zufälligen Makulaturblättern, in two volumes. A planned third volume was never completed.

Synopsis 

The text of the book states it is the autobiography of a cat named Murr who has learned to write. The content of the book is therefore the life and work of the cat Murr, as written by Murr. However, in between Murr's autobiography, there are pages of a biography of another character, Johannes Kreisler.

Reception 
Critic Alex Ross writes of the novel: "If the phantasmagoric 'Kater Murr' were published tomorrow as the work of a young Brooklyn hipster, it might be hailed as a tour de force of postmodern fiction."

Jeffrey Ford described the novel as a "complex, truly wild fiction" where Hoffmann "pieced together the fragments of his own shattered psyche and commented on the relationship of art and artists to society."

English translations 
An English translation by Anthea Bell was published in 1999 by Penguin Classics.

Notes

References

External links

 

German fantasy novels
Novels by E. T. A. Hoffmann
Novels about cats
1819 German novels
1821 German novels
1810s fantasy novels
1820s fantasy novels

Metafictional novels